Lage Viktor Sigurd Andersson (31 May 1920 – 14 October 1999) was a Swedish weightlifter. Competing in the unlimited weight division he won bronze medals at the 1950 and 1952 European championships and placed ninth at the 1952 Olympics.

References

External links
 

1920 births
1999 deaths
Swedish male weightlifters
Olympic weightlifters of Sweden
Weightlifters at the 1952 Summer Olympics
People from Mörbylånga Municipality
Sportspeople from Kalmar County
20th-century Swedish people